Bishop William Regis Fey, O.F.M.Cap. (November 6, 1942 – January 19, 2021) was an American Roman Catholic prelate.

Biography
Fey was born in Pittsburgh, Pennsylvania, United States, on November 6, 1942. He made his first profession as a member of the Order of Friars Minor Capuchin on July 14, 1963, and final profession on July 14, 1966. Fey was ordained a priest on October 19, 1968.

His superiors at the St. Augustine Province of the Capuchin Franciscans sent him to Oxford University where he earned his DPhil. Oxeniensis in Philosophy. Fey taught at St. Fidelis Seminary College in Herman, Pennsylvania and Borromeo College in Wickliffe, Ohio before going to Papua New Guinea to teach Philosophy in a seminary there. He left for two years to teach Philosophy in Zambia, and then returned to Papua New Guinea. Fey was appointed bishop of the Roman Catholic Diocese of Kimbe, in Kimbe, Papua New Guinea, on June 8, 2010, and was ordained bishop on October 10 of that year. He made an Ad Limina visit to Pope Benedict XVI in Rome in June 2012.

He was working towards building a catechetical training center in his diocese, and he had been requested by the provincial government in New Britain to work with them on establishing a teacher's college. He and Cardinal Sean O'Malley, OFM. Cap., Archbishop of Boston, Massachusetts and Bishop Donald Francis Lippert, OFM Cap all began religious life with the St Augustine Province of Capuchins based in Pittsburgh, Pennsylvania. 

Fey died from COVID-19 in Pittsburgh on January 19, 2021, at the age of 78, during the COVID-19 pandemic in Pennsylvania.

References

1942 births
2021 deaths
Religious leaders from Pittsburgh
Alumni of the University of Oxford
Capuchin bishops
American Roman Catholic priests
21st-century Roman Catholic bishops in Papua New Guinea
Deaths from the COVID-19 pandemic in Pennsylvania
Roman Catholic bishops of Kimbe